Tattooed Millionaire is the first solo album by Iron Maiden vocalist Bruce Dickinson, released in 1990.

The album project began when Dickinson was asked to record a song for A Nightmare on Elm Street 5: The Dream Child, and so wrote "Bring Your Daughter... to the Slaughter". Collaborating with future Iron Maiden guitarist Janick Gers, Dickinson began creating a solo album which was fundamentally different from his works with Iron Maiden, with a hard rock sound that is less progressive.  "Bring your Daughter..." wasn't included on the original release, as Iron Maiden planned to record an alternate version for their 1990 album No Prayer for the Dying, which went on to become the band's only number one single on the UK Singles Chart to date.

The album did however yield four Top 40 singles in the UK, with the lead and title single "Tattooed Millionaire", reaching No. 18. A cover of the David Bowie penned, Mott the Hoople hit "All the Young Dudes", was also a relative success, reaching No. 23.

Track listings

Personnel
Musicians
 Bruce Dickinson – vocals
 Janick Gers – guitar
 Andy Carr – bass
 Fabio Del Rio – drums

Production
Chris Tsangarides - producer, engineer
Nigel Green - mixing
Chris Marshall - assistant engineer
Ian Cooper - mastering at Townhouse Studios, London

Charts

Album

Singles

Tattooed Millionaire

All the Young Dudes

Dive! Dive! Dive!

Born in '58

Certifications

References

1990 debut albums
Bruce Dickinson albums
Albums produced by Chris Tsangarides
Columbia Records albums
EMI Records albums